Nadiya's British Food Adventure is a British television cookery show. The series is presented by Nadiya Hussain.

Nadiya's British Food Adventure sees Hussain undertake a road trip around Britain, visiting a different region from the Highlands of Scotland to the coasts of Devon and Dorset, to uncover some of the country's most exciting food pioneers.

The eight-part series aired on BBC Two in 2017 and is produced by BBC Studios. The first episode aired on 17 July 2017 where Hussain visited an Oxfordshire farm and cooks her hosts a dish with their own produce.

Awards and nominations

Ratings
Episode Viewing figures from BARB.

Book
A tie-in cookery book was published by Michael Joseph in July 2017 and topped charts for Hardback Non-Fiction.

See also
Nadiya's Family Favourites

References

External links
 
 

2017 British television series debuts
2017 British television series endings
BBC Television shows
British cooking television shows
English-language television shows
Television series by BBC Studios